Sir George James "G.J" Coles, CBE (28 March 1885 – 4 December 1977) was an Australian entrepreneur. He was the founder of what was to become the Coles Group retail shopping empire, a large chain store group in Australia.

Early life
Born in Jung Jung, Victoria (now Jung, between Horsham and Murtoa) to shopkeeper George W. Coles (died 1932) and Elizabeth Mary Coles (née Scouler) (died 1900), the first of ten children; he was educated at Beechworth College. His mother died following the birth of her eleventh child in 1900.

Personal life

Business career
George purchased his father's shop in 1910 after having worked in Melbourne and the country for a few years. He took trips to the United States of America and Britain to learn about the American and British methods of retailing.

In 1914, with brothers Jim and Arthur and capital of £2000, he opened his first shop in Smith Street, Collingwood with the slogan "Nothing over a shilling", which in the early 1930s became "Nothing over 2/6d"

Brother Arthur enlisted with the AIF shortly after Australia joined the "Great War" (World War I). He was twice wounded and was repatriated in 1916. George enlisted with the 60th Battalion of the AIF in March 1917 and fought in France as a lance corporal. Brothers Jim and David were killed during the conflict. Their uncle Jim helped manage the store during their absences.

Brothers
James Scouler "Jim" Coles (1 July 1888 – 10 August 1916) was educated at Geelong College, helped brother George with his first store, joined the AIF in August 1915, served in France with the (2nd Division) 4th Field Artillery Brigade during World War I and was killed in action.
Sir Arthur William "A.W." Coles (6 August 1892 – 14 June 1982) joined the 6th Battalion in August 1914. He was twice wounded in action (at Gallipoli and in France) and was repatriated in 1916. He momentarily displaced George as chairman in 1936 in a coup and was made managing director. He was elected Lord Mayor of Melbourne in 1938 and re-elected twice. He was appointed to a number of highly public organisations and was knighted in 1960.
David Henry Coles (July 1894 – 20 October 1917) had little to do with the business; he moved to Wilmot, Tasmania with his father after George took over the business. He served in Belgium with the (4th Division Artillery) 10th Field Artillery Brigade during World War I and died of wounds.
Sir (Kenneth) Frank "K.F." Coles (19 April 1896 – 2 April 1985) was knighted in 1957, henceforth known as "Sir Kenneth". He retired from the board in 1976
Sir Edgar Barton Coles "E.B." (3 June 1899 – 19 February 1981) first secretary of G. J. Coles Ltd, drove much of the company's expansion and entry into television advertising. He was knighted in 1959.
Sir Norman Cameron "N.C." Coles (17 September 1907 – 24 November 1989) was born to George (senior)'s second wife Ann Cameron, née Topp, in Victoria but was mostly educated in Tasmania. He joined G. J. Coles & Coy. Ltd in 1924 and became managing director 1967 – 1975. He was chairman of the board from 1968, and deputy chairman of K-mart (Australia) Ltd. from 1967. He was knighted in 1977.

Post-war expansion
In 1924 they opened the store at Deva House, Bourke Street, Melbourne. Brothers Edgar, Kenneth and Norman had joined the Company.

In 1927 they had nine stores, all in Victoria. In that year they first offered shares to the public.

In 1938 G. J. Coles & Co. Ltd. had 86 stores across Australia and 168 in 1953.

In 1976 G. J. Coles & Co. Ltd. had 576 stores and a staff of over 36,000 See Coles Group for a fuller history of the company, particularly its later developments.

Other
He was managing director of G. J. Coles & Co from 1923 to 1931, when, after some illness he handed the leadership role to Arthur, but remained as chairman of the board (despite very public opposition to his autocratic style) until 1956. He maintained membership of the board until 1976, when he retired.

With his role in the company reduced, he was able to devote his time and energies to philanthropic and political causes. He was on the board of the Alfred Hospital and from 1933 its honorary treasurer.

He was an active member of St John's Anglican Church in Toorak.

He was an active member of Rotary and president of its Melbourne club in 1934. He helped found the Institute of Public Affairs, and was its president in 1965. He expounded on his philosophies in an interview in the January 1966 issue of their newsletter.

With fellow businessmen R. M. Williams and Sam Hordern he helped found the Equestrian Federation of Australia in 1951 to support Australia's 1956 Olympic Games equestrian team. Because of quarantine restrictions, these events were held in Stockholm, Sweden rather than the Olympic host city, Melbourne.

He was on the board of the Victorian Hospitals and Charities Commission from 1935. He was on the board of the National Bank. He was an active member of the Royal Melbourne Golf Club and the Peninsula Golf Club (including a four-year term as president), the Athenaeum Club, the Victoria Racing Club and the Melbourne Cricket Club.

Awards
appointed a CBE in 1942
Knighted in 1957.
Australia's National Portrait Gallery (NPG) also holds portraits of Sir Arthur, Sir Edgar, Sir Kenneth and Sir Norman by William Dargie.

References

1885 births
1977 deaths
People educated at Launceston Church Grammar School
Australian businesspeople in retailing
Australian Knights Bachelor
Australian company founders
Commanders of the Order of the British Empire
Place of death missing
Businesspeople from Victoria (Australia)